Einar Mårtensson was a Swedish footballer who played as a forward.

References 

Association football forwards
Swedish footballers
Allsvenskan players
Malmö FF players
Year of birth missing